Dalea austrotexana, common name dune dalea, is a plant species endemic to southern Texas. It is known only from Jim Hogg, Brooks, Cameron, Kenedy and Starr Counties, all at the very southern tip of the state. The species prefers sandy locations such as coastal dunes or sand flats.

Dalea austrotexana is trailing, perennial herb with woody, orange taproots. Stems lay prostrate on the ground. Leaves are odd-pinnate, up to 2 cm (0.8 inches) long. Flowers are pale purple. Fruits are about 2.5 mm (0.1 inch) long, densely hairy. The species appears related to D. lanata; indeed, herbarium specimens had been labeled as such until D. austrotexana was described as a new species in 2006.

References

austrotexana
Endemic flora of Texas
Flora without expected TNC conservation status